The 1980 Portland State Vikings football team was an American football team that represented Portland State University as an independent during the 1980 NCAA Division I-AA football season. In its sixth and final season under head coach Mouse Davis, the team compiled an 8–3 record and outscored opponents by a total of 550 to 209. The team utilized the run and shoot offense popularized by Davis and gained national acclaim for its high-scoring offensive output, including single-game tallies of 105 and 93 points.  On the field, the team was led by senior quarterback Neil Lomax. During the 1980 season, Lomax tallied 4,094 passing yards and became the all-time leader in college football history with a career total of 13,200 passing yards.

Schedule

Roster

References

Portland State
Portland State Vikings football seasons
Portland State Vikings football
Portland State Vikings football